Lars-Olof Norling (born 30 September 1935) is a retired Swedish light heavyweight boxer. He competed at the 1960 Summer Olympics, but was eliminated in the second round.

1960 Olympic results
Below is the record of Lars-Olof Norling, a Swedish light heavyweight boxer who competed at the 1960 Rome Olympics:
 
 Round of 32: bye
 Round of 16: lost to Tony Madigan (Australia) by decision, 0-5

References

1935 births
Living people
Boxers at the 1960 Summer Olympics
Olympic boxers of Sweden
Swedish male boxers
Light-heavyweight boxers
20th-century Swedish people